cAMP receptor protein (CRP; also known as catabolite activator protein, CAP) is a regulatory protein in bacteria. CRP protein binds cAMP, which causes a conformational change that allows CRP to bind tightly to a specific DNA site in the promoters of the genes it controls. CRP then activates transcription through direct protein–protein interactions with RNA polymerase.

The genes regulated by CRP are mostly involved in energy metabolism, such as galactose, citrate, or the PEP group translocation system. In Escherichia coli, cyclic AMP receptor protein (CRP) can regulate the transcription of more than 100 genes.

The signal to activate CRP is the binding of cyclic AMP. Binding of cAMP to CRP leads to a long-distance signal transduction from the N-terminal cAMP-binding domain to the C-terminal domain of the protein, which is responsible for interaction with specific sequences of DNA.

At "Class I" CRP-dependent promoters, CRP binds to a DNA site located upstream of core promoter elements and activates transcription through protein–protein interactions between "activating region 1" of CRP and the C-terminal domain of RNA polymerase alpha subunit. At "Class II" CRP-dependent promoters, CRP binds to a DNA site that overlaps the promoter -35 element and activates transcription through two sets of protein–protein interactions: (1) an interaction between "activating region 1" of CRP and the C-terminal domain of RNA polymerase alpha subunit, and (2) an interaction between "activating region 2" of CRP and the N-terminal domain of RNA polymerase alpha subunit.  At "Class III" CRP-dependent promoters, CRP functions together with one or more "co-activator" proteins.

At most CRP-dependent promoters, CRP activates transcription primarily or exclusively through a "recruitment" mechanism, in which protein–protein interactions between CRP and RNA polymerase assist binding of RNA polymerase to the promoter.

References

Bacterial proteins